Tony Cuesta (13 June 1926 — 2 December 1992) was an anti-Castro Cuban activist.

Life
Cuesta was educated at the University of Havana. Initially a member of the 26th of July Movement and a close supporter of Fidel Castro, Cuesta in 1960 defected to the United States, and in 1961 was one of the founders of the anti-Communist paramilitary organization Alpha 66. He later set up the guerilla group "Comandos L" (the L standing for Libertad) which operated out of Anguilla and, under his command, in 1963 sank the Soviet freighter Baku in Caibarién Harbour.

In 1966 Cuesta was captured in Cuba, in a skirmish that cost him a hand and his eyesight. He remained in prison there until 1978. After his release he returned to Miami, and refounded Comandos L.

He died in Miami on 2 December 1992. He was married four times.

Sources
"Tony Cuesta, Leader Of Anti-Castro Unit, Dies at 66 in Miami", New York Times, Dec. 4, 1992.

1926 births
1992 deaths
Cuban activists
University of Havana alumni
Cuban prisoners and detainees
Cuban emigrants to the United States